The Scorpion King: Book of Souls is a thrilling direct-to-video sword and sorcery action-adventure film that was released on October 23, 2018. As the fifth installment in The Scorpion King series, it represents the culmination of the original series and a sequel to The Scorpion King 4: Quest for Power. The film stars Zach McGowan as Mathayus, along with Pearl Thusi, Mayling Ng, and Peter Mensah in supporting roles. Directed by Don Michael Paul and written by David Alton Hedges.

Plot
In ancient Egypt, King Memtep makes a covenant with Anubis, lord of the underworld, to create a cursed sword so powerful that whoever possesses it could rule the world.  The sword, named the Fang of Anubis, is fueled by taking the souls of its enemies; the names of those killed by the sword are forever written in the Book of Souls.

Nebserek plunders the tomb of King Memtep and steals the Fang of Anubis.  Meanwhile, his lieutenant Khensa captures the blacksmith Mathayus (Zach McGowan), who they claim is the Scorpion King (which he denies) and kills his friend Abel.  A warrior from Nubia, Tala, frees the blacksmith and heals him with the stings of scorpions. She tells him that her father, Balthazar, King of Nubia, told her to find the legendary Scorpion King to help bring peace to Egypt. She demands he join in a quest to end the evil empire of Nebserek.  Nebserek is warned by his priestess that the sword can be destroyed by the Book of Souls, so they begin to seek it out.

On the way to the Valley of the 13th Moon, Mathayus and Tala are captured by Uruk, leader of the Black Arrows, for trespassing.  Mathayus requests he die with honor, being hunted, and Uruk accepts.  After defeating and sparing the lives of four men and Uruk, Uruk releases them with respect.  They continue on their quest to the gateway of the Temple of Scrolls.  Tala opens the sacred gate using a lens that manipulates moonlight.  Inside, they are attacked by a golem, Enkidu.  A woman called Amina appears and explains that Enkidu was formed from clay and brought to life by magic to protect her.  She reveals that she is the Book of Souls and sees and feels the souls taken by the Fang of Anubis. Wishing for her to join them, Mathayus traps Enkidu in the cave with a wall of fire and they head to the tomb of Memtep.

The three are attacked on a beach by Harhar (another of Nebsereks's lieutenants) and some soldiers. They kill them all with the help of Enkidu, who braves the flames to protect Amina.  They go into a city to get passage on a boat and Mathayus attacks Khensa; he does not kill her.  As they escape by boat, Amina sees and feels the death of King Tarqa by Nebserek. He was Tala's brother; she is now queen.  They then find the tomb and inside a Sphinx statue they find the way to end the curse of the sword - destroy the Book of Souls.  Just as they discover this, Nebserek catches up to them and they are captured.

Mathayus is chained up and Nebserek plans to fight him honorably, but he cuts his side with the sword.  Tala and Enkidu are jailed together; now that she is queen the Nubian captives agree to fight on her command.  Having seen Nebserek with the captives, the Black Arrows sneak up to their camp and prepare to fight.  Tala wills Mathayus to remember being the Scorpion King, and several scorpions sting him, invigorating him to break his chains.  Tala and Enkidu then break out of the jail and begin to fight Khensa.  Uruk and the Black Arrows attack and kill the priestess, Mennofer.  Nebserek is enraged and fights Mathayus while Tala and Khensa battle.  Enkidu is stabbed with the Fang of Anubis and falls into the fire with it to protect Amina.  The Scorpion King kills Khensa and throws Nebserek into the fire.  He takes the sword from the fire; Amina insists she die by the sword to break its curse and free the souls it took.  She walks into the blade and she and it turn to sand.  Mathayus rides off alone.

Cast

Reception 
The Scorpion King: Book of Souls received mixed reviews from critics and audiences. On Rotten Tomatoes, the film has an approval rating of 33% based on 6 reviews, with an average rating of 4.3/10. As a direct-to-video release, the film was not widely reviewed by mainstream critics.

Some critics praised the film's action sequences and visual effects, as well as the performance of lead actor Zach McGowan. Others criticized the film's plot and dialogue as being formulaic and uninspired.

Despite the mixed reception, The Scorpion King: Book of Souls was well-received by fans of the franchise, who appreciated the film's continuation of the series' trademark action and adventure. Additionally, the film performed well commercially, debuting at number 2 on the DVD and Blu-ray charts upon its release.

References

External links
 
 

2018 films
2010s fantasy adventure films
2018 direct-to-video films
Direct-to-video sequel films
Direct-to-video interquel films
Direct-to-video prequel films
Films scored by Frederik Wiedmann
2010s action adventure films
American action adventure films
Universal Pictures direct-to-video films
Films directed by Don Michael Paul
Ancient Mesopotamia in popular culture
The Scorpion King (film series)
2010s English-language films
2010s American films
American prequel films